Berlandiera subacaulis is a North American species of flowering plant in the family Asteraceae. It is found only in Florida. The common name is Florida greeneyes.

Berlandiera subacaulis is a branching herb up to 50 cm (20 inches) tall. It generally has only one flower head with lemon yellow ray florets and red or maroon disc florets. It grows in dry, sandy locations.

References

External links
Lady Bird Johnson Wildflower Center, University of Texas
Wildflowers of the Enchanted Forest, Enchanted Forest Nature Sanctuary, Titusville, Florida

subacaulis
Endemic flora of Florida
Plants described in 1827
Flora without expected TNC conservation status